The men's qualifying round for the 2009 World Artistic Gymnastics Championships took place on 13 October 2009. There were 3 subdivisions

Individual all-around

Floor exercise

Pommel horse

Rings

Vault

Parallel bars

Horizontal bar

References 

2009 World Artistic Gymnastics Championships